The Eupatorian Kenassas is the temple complex of Crimean Karaites (karaev) located in Yevpatoria, Crimea. It covers an area of 0.25 hectares and consists of large and small kenesa buildings (meetinghouses), building religious schools (Midrash), charity dining, household courtyards and multiple courtyards (grape, marble, waiting for the prayer Ritual, Memorial). The kenesa has been a centre of the religious life of the Karaites of Yevpatoria since 1837.

Gallery 

Karaite synagogues
Cultural heritage monuments of federal significance in Crimea
Buildings and structures in Crimea
Synagogues in Ukraine